Galeotto Manfredi (1440 – May 31, 1488) was an Italian condottiero and lord of Faenza.

Born in Faenza, Romagna, he was the son of Astorre II Manfredi. In 1477, after a failed attempt of military conquest, he succeeded as lord of Faenza to his brother Carlo, taking advantage of a rebellion against him. In his youth years he had fought under the famous condottiero Bartolomeo Colleoni for the Republic of Venice. In 1483 he was made commander of the Florentine Army, and fought in the Wars in Lombardy.

In 1481 he married Francesca Bentivoglio, daughter of Giovanni II Bentivoglio, lord of Bologna. Galeotto was killed by her in an attack of jealousy in May 1488. He was succeeded by his son Astorre.

External links
Page at condottieridiventura.it 

1440 births
1488 deaths
Galeotto
Manfredi, Galetto
15th-century condottieri
Lords of Faenza